The 1964 Waltham Forest Council election took place on 7 May 1964 to elect members of Waltham Forest London Borough Council in London, England. The whole council was up for election and the Labour party gained control of the council.

Background
These elections were the first to the newly formed borough. Previously elections had taken place in the Municipal Borough of Chingford, Municipal Borough of Leyton and Municipal Borough of Walthamstow. These boroughs were joined to form the new London Borough of Waltham Forest by the London Government Act 1963.

A total of 161 candidates stood in the election for the 48 seats being contested across 16 wards. These included a full slate from the Labour and Liberal parties, while the Conservative stood 42 candidates. Other candidates included 18 Residents and 5 Communists. All wards were three-seat wards.

This election had aldermen as well as directly elected councillors.  Labour got all 8 aldermen.

The Council was elected in 1964 as a "shadow authority" but did not start operations until 1 April 1965.

Election result
The results saw Labour gain the new council with a majority of 24 after winning 36 of the 48 seats. Overall turnout in the election was 32.0%. This turnout included 716 postal votes.

Ward results

References

1964
1964 London Borough council elections